Matej Rojc is a Slovenian professional basketball player currently playing for Šenčur. He is a 1.98 m tall Point guard.

References

1993 births
Living people
ABA League players
KK Krka players
KK Zlatorog Laško players
Slovenian men's basketball players
Sportspeople from Koper
Point guards
Helios Suns players